Stephen Au Kam-tong (born 26 April 1963) is a Hong Kong actor for TVB (2000–present). He was formerly an actor for ATV (1990–2000).

He played David Mo (武紀勇) in TVB sitcom Best Selling Secrets (2007–2008). He also played the role of Yim Yue Dai (閆汝大) in TVB sitcom Off Pedder.
Au is also got a black belt in full contact karate.

Filmography

Films
The God of Cookery (1996) - MC for Stephen
Forbidden City Cop (1996) - Presents Flying Fairy
Bloody Friday (1996) - Ken
July 13th (1996) - Lung's ghost sonBanana Club (1996)Hong Kong Night Club (1998) - MichaelYou Light Up My Life (1998)Body Weapon (1999) - Officer Sam LeeCentury Hero (1999)What You Gonna Do, Sai Fung (1999) - Sai-fungTsimshatsui Floating Corpse (1999) (TV Movie)The Blood Rules (2000) - TomA Game of No Rule (2000) - Officer Dick KoFatal Attraction (2000)A Decade of Love (2008)Overheard (2009) - WeberOnce a Gangster (2010)Unbeatable (2013)That Demon Within (2014)Z Storm (2014)Little Big Master (2015)To the Fore (2015)Three (2016)Distinction (2018)Declared Legally Dead (2019)The First Girl I Love (2019)

TelevisionQ Biu Je (Q表姐) (1990)Spirit of the Dragon (李小龍傳) (1992)Mythical Crane Magic Needle (仙鹤神针) (1992)Who is the Winner III (1993)Fist of Fury (1995) - Thai boxerWho is the Killer (1996)The Pride of Chao Zhou (1997)I Come From Guangzhou (1998)Flaming Brothers (1998)A Lawyer Can Be Good (1998)Ten Tigers Of Guangdong (1999)Showbiz Tycoon (2000)Dare to Strike (2000)Legal Entanglement (2002)A Case of Misadventure (2002)Burning Flame II (2002)Witness to a Prosecution II (2003)Ups and Downs in the Sea of Love (2003)Hard Fate (2004)Angels of Mission (2004) - Lee Tin WahStrike at Heart (2004)The Biter Bitten (2005) - Gam LamReal Kung Fu (2005) (episode 1 only)Placebo Cure (2006)The Legend of Love (2007)Best Selling Secrets (2007–2008) - David MoLegend of the Demigods (2008)Off Pedder (2008–2010) - Yim Yue DaiBe Home for Dinner (2011)No Good Either Way (2012)ICAC Investigators 2014'' (2014)

References

External links
Official TVB blog of Stephen Au

Personal site

1967 births
TVB veteran actors
20th-century Hong Kong male actors
Living people